The Johnson Creek Covered Bridge is located four miles north of Blue Licks Battlefield State Park in Robertson County and is currently closed to vehicular traffic.  The bridge is important as the only known example of Robert Smith's truss system in Kentucky and the only covered bridge extant known to have been built by Jacob N. Bower (1819-1906).

The bridge was constructed in 1874 and was one of thirteen that remained, now eleven, of more than four hundred covered bridges in Kentucky.  Around 1912, Jacob Bower's son, Louis, added an arch on each side to support increased traffic using the bridge.  The bridge is 114 feet long and 16 feet wide, according to Louis Bower, grandson of Jacob Bower and a local covered bridge builder.

Later generations have advanced numerous reasons for the construction of covered bridges, but the historical reason for their existence was the maintenance of structural integrity.  The cover allowed timbered trusses and braces to season properly and kept water out of the joints, prolonging their lives by seven to eight times that of an uncovered bridge.

It is located on what is now a bypass named Covered Bridge Rd., off Kentucky Route 1029 (Old Blue Lick Rd.), about 6.4 miles southeast of Mt. Olivet, Kentucky by road and about 4.0 miles north of Blue Licks Battlefield State Park. It crosses Johnson Creek, a tributary to the Licking River.

References

Covered bridges on the National Register of Historic Places in Kentucky
Wooden bridges in Kentucky
National Register of Historic Places in Robertson County, Kentucky
Road bridges on the National Register of Historic Places in Kentucky
Truss bridges in the United States
Transportation in Robertson County, Kentucky
1874 establishments in Kentucky
Bridges completed in 1874